The Germany women's national football team has represented Germany at the FIFA Women's World Cup on eight occasions in 1991,  1995, 1999,  2003, 2007, 2011, 2015 and 2019. They have won the title twice and were runners-up once. They also reached the fourth place in 1991 and in 2015.

1991 World Cup

The German national team had qualified as the European Champions for the first World Cup. With 18 players, national coach Gero Bisanz drove to the "Middle Kingdom". In the preliminary round, the German team celebrated three wins and remained without conceding. Nigeria was defeated 4-0, Taiwan 2-0 and Italy national football team 2-0. In the quarter-finals was the opponent Denmark. The game was the first of the World Cup history, which went into extra time. The Bisanz-Elf finally prevailed 2-1. Opponent in the semifinals was the selection of  the United States, which was a number too big for the German team. At the end of the match, it was a 0-4 defeat in the third-place match against Sweden. Heidi Mohr proved with her seven tournament goals that she was one of the world's top scorer in her time.

Group C

Quarter-finals

Semi-finals

Third place play-off

1995 World cup

Once again, the German team qualified as European champion for the second World Cup. For the first time the World Cup took place on European soil. The German team failed in the final Norway.

The German team started with a painstaking 1-0 victory (goal: Silvia Neid) over Japan in the tournament. In the second group game, the hosts waited and it looked as if the German team could reciprocate for the defeat in the small final of 1991. Bettina Wiegmann and Ursula Lohn ensured the 2-0 half-time lead. After Andersson's strike, the Swedes could still play the game in the last five minutes. Due to the defeat, the last group match against Brazil had to be won. With a brilliant 6: 1 victory, the Elf of Gero Bisanz secured the group victory. Birgit Prinz scored her first World Cup goal.

In the quarter-finals, Germany met England. Maren Meinert, Heidi Mohr and Martina Voss ensured a solid 3-0 victory. The semi-final was more difficult against China. The Chinese made in the defense deft the rooms and allowed only a few chances for the German team. After many futile attempts Bettina Wiegmann scored in the 79th minute the redeeming 1: 0. Thus, the German team reached the final against Norway for the first time. A Norwegian strike just before half-time through Riise and Pettersen sealed the final defeat.

Group A

Quarter-finals

Semi-finals

Final

1999 World Cup

For the third World Cup UEFA started Qualifying for the first time). To date, UEFA is the only continental federation to hold separate World Cup qualifiers. The DFB-Elf, who have been coached by  Tina Theune-Meyer since 1996, had to relegate after a surprising defeat against Netherlands and another defeat by Norway. In the relegation, the Germans made it all by the 5-0 first-leg victory against the Ukraine everything.

The German team was difficult in the preliminary round. At the beginning there was a happy draw against Italy. In the second game, World Cup debutant Mexico was knocked down 6: 0. Inka Grings was the first German player to score three goals in a World Cup match. In the last group match, the team did not come out over a 3: 3 against Brazil and was only second in the group. In the quarterfinals, they met the host and failed on their own nerves. Despite two leads (Brandi Chastain by own goal, Bettina Wiegmann), Theune-Meyer-Elf lost 2: 3.

Group B

Quarter-finals

2003 World Cup

At the 2003 World Cup, the German national team for the first time world champion. This made Germany the first nation to win a world title in both men's and women's football. Actually, the World Cup should take place again in the People's Republic of China. Due to the SARS epidemic, the tournament was temporarily relocated to the United States. The German team kept a white vest during qualifying. All six games were won and only the Englishwoman Rachel Yankey could score a goal against the German team.

In the first round match the German team met Canada. The Canadians took the lead after a few minutes. Thereafter, the German team turned up and came to a 4-1 victory. It was followed by a 3-0 victory over Japan and at the conclusion of the preliminary round, a 6-1 victory against Argentina. In this game, Steffi Jones suffered an Anterior cruciate ligament injury and had to travel home.

As a group winner the Germans reached the quarterfinals. The Russians was sent home with a 7-1 score. Kerstin Garefrekes and Birgit Prinz scored two goals each. In the semifinals the opponent was called USA again. In a women's football game of all time, which was the best for many experts, the German team was able to successfully take revenge and moved into the final with a 3-0 victory. In the final, the German team met Sweden. This resulted in a new edition of the Euro 2001. Just before the half-time whistle, Hanna Ljungberg took the Trekroners into the lead. Not even a minute was played in the second half when Maren Meinert equalized. After regular time it was 1: 1, so that an extension was necessary. In the 98th minute, the German team received a free kick. Renate Lingor brought the leather into the box. Nia Künzer headed the ball over Swedish keeper Caroline Jönsson. With this Golden Goal Germany was world champion.

Group C

Quarter-finals

Semi-finals

Final

2007 World Cup

In qualifying, the German team could win all the games and qualify so confidently for the World Cup in China. For the first time the team received a bonus for the successful qualification. A total of 200,000 euros were distributed by the DFB. The World Cup, in which the German team met in the preliminary round on Argentina, England and Japan, was then for the German team to the tournament of superlatives, because they set the following records:
 Longest series without defeat (women): 12 games (six in 2003 and 2007), previously USA 11 games (1995 (match for third place), 1999 (6) and 2003 (4))
 Longest series without conceding (men and women): 6 games (2007), previously Italy 5 games in men (World Cup 1990) and Germany (1991), Norway (1995), Sweden (1991), USA (1991 and 2003) and PR China (1999) with 3 games each for women.
 Highest world championship victory (men and women) of all time: With the 11: 0 in the opening match against Argentina, both the previous records of women (Japan-Sweden 0: 8, 1991 FIFA Women's World Cup and Norway-Nigeria 8: 0 1995 FIFA Women's World Cup) as well as the men's record (Hungary-El Salvador 10: 1 1982 FIFA World Cup)) outbid. It is also the top scoring opening game (men and women) of all time.
 First title defense of a women's world champion
 First title win (women and men) without conceding
 Birgit Prinz is the women's World Cup record scorer with 14 goals in total (previously Michelle Akers / USA with 12 goals).
 Silvia Neid succeeded as the first national coach (women and men) to win the title in their first World Cup.

After winning the record for the opening match against Argentina, the team had to content themselves with a goalless draw against England, but by a 2-0 win over Japan, the team could qualify for the quarter-final against North Korea which she won 3-0. The semi-final against Norway was won 3-0. In the final against Brazil then faced two equal teams, with the Brazilians with Marta and Cristiane had the better single players, but the German team was occupied more homogeneous and so ultimately the final could win 2-0.

Group A

Quarter-finals

Semi-finals

Final

2011 World Cup

At the home World Cup Germany wanted to be the first country to win the title for the third time in a row. The Bundesliga season was ended in mid-March, the cup final held in late March. The initially 26-member squad met for seven courses between which four friendly matches against teams with similar playing styles as the group opponents took place. In the process, Silvia Neid changed her starting line-up again and again, especially during the attack, and also up to six players during the matches. All friendly matches were won without conceding and scored 15 goals. Five of them scored U-20 World Cup top scorer Alexandra Popp. Nevertheless, she came in the World Cup matches only as a substitute used and remained without scoring.

In the opening match Germany started with a 2-1 victory over Canada. This was followed by a hard-fought 1-0 against African champions Nigeria. After these two victories, the quarter-finals were fixed. In both games, record national player and captain Birgit Prinz was replaced. In the final group match against France and also in the quarter-final, she did not come to use. If the German team in the match against France could significantly increase and defeat the previously also twice victorious French with 4-2, so had to accept the first defeat against Japan after 15 World Cup games without defeat and for the second time after 1999 after the quarter-finals to pack the bags. It was the fourth defeat in a World Cup - knockout-round against the eventual champion.

After the departure, Bernd Schröder in particular criticized the too long preparation time as well as the tactics. For Schröder, the long preparation time also had the disadvantage that the national team of 1. FFC Turbine Potsdam were not available to prepare for Champions League Final, which lost to Potsdam 2-0 at the end of May against Olympique Lyon ,

Birgit Prinz and Ariane Hingst, both of whom had played for Germany for more than 14 years, announced their retirement from the national team immediately after their defeat by Japan, but the DFB announced a farewell match that would not have been possible for Birgit Prinz on 27 March 2012 took place. Silvia Neid initially did not want to comment on her future in a few weeks. But on 13 July, the national coach announced that she wanted to fulfill her contract, which had been extended until the 2016 World Cup, and would like to build a new team for the European Championship 2013. With this, the European title could be defended.

With the defeat and the simultaneous semi-final entry of France and Sweden also for the first time the qualification for the Olympic women's tournament missed.

On 23 and 29 August 2011, Ursula Holl and Kerstin Garefrekes also announced their departure from the national team.

After the quarter-final against Japan, the team remained unbeaten in 22 games successively and lost only in the final of 2013 Algarve Cup against the United States.

Group A

Quarter-finals

2015 World Cup

In the Qualification, which started in the autumn of 2013 after the European Championships in Sweden, the team met Russia, Ireland, the Slovakia, Slovenia and Croatia. Except for Slovenia, the German team had previously played against all other group opponents and also lost no game against them, with only Russia could score goals against the German team. Most recently, Germany, the most frequent opponent of the Russian team, met Russia in a friendly for the 2009 European Championship in August 2009 and won 3-1 in Bochum. Two matches against Slovakia were played in the qualifiers for the 1997 European Championships in 1995 and 1996, Croatia were opponents in qualifying for the 1995 European Championship and against Ireland, the team played twice in qualifying for the 2007 World Cup. Apart from Russia, none of the group opponents could qualify for a World Cup or European Championship finals.

The German team met Russia in the first match on 21 September 2013 and inflicted the highest defeat on Russia at 9: 0, which was decisive that Russia missed the playoff games of the best runners-up in the end. Then came on 26 October for the first time encounter with Slovenia, the German team with the 13: 0 in Slovenia, the highest victory in a World Cup qualifying and the highest away win succeeded. The following games were won without conceding, so that the German team went with five wins and 40: 0 goals in the winter break. The qualification was continued on April 5, 2014 with the game in Ireland, with the German team had to accept the first goals in a 3-2 victory. For the German team ended the qualification on September 17, 2014 with a 2-0 win in the home game against Ireland. Germany won all 10 games and qualified prematurely on September 13 for the World Cup.

As the World Cup in Canada is to be played on artificial turf, against which several players have spoken out, the German team played on October 29, 2014 in the Behrn Arena in Örebro against Sweden a test match on artificial turf, which was won 2-1. Previously a friendly match against France was lost 2-0 at Offenbach am Main and then at London on 23 November Wembley Stadium against England 3-0 win.

In the group draw in Ottawa, Canada, on December 6, 2014, Germany, previously group head of Group B, was scored as an opponent: Ivory Coast, Norway and Thailand.

Germany put in the first game against Ivory Coast with a 10: 0, the second highest World Cup victory a sign. They dominated the first half of the final against Norway, but only scored one goal and had to equalize in the second half. Also against physically inferior Thai women they were the game-determining team, but could only score four goals. Nevertheless, they were group winners with the better goal difference, as Norway had won with the same result against Thailand, against the Ivory Coast, only a 3-1 reached. Sweden were defeated 4-1 in the round of 16, with the Swedish goalkeeper still their best player. In the quarter-final against strong French women, the DFB-Elf could prevail only in the penalty shoot-out, against the US was then in the semi-final, the marksmanship away from the penalty spot, so that the game was lost 0: 2. In the small final was then lost for the first time against England, which had never been beyond the quarter-finals.

Group B

Round of 16

Quarter-finals

Semi-finals

Third place play-off

2019 World Cup

In the Qualification, which began in the autumn of 2017 after the European Championships in the Netherlands, the team met Iceland, Czech Republic, for the first time the Faroe Islands and Slovenia. The German team, who were eliminated for the first time at the European Championships in the quarter-finals and then Anja Mittag had announced her resignation, met in the first game on Slovenia and won 6-0. Simone Laudehr, who could not play a year due to injury, made her 100th international appearance. Three days later, in the Czech Republic, it was only a painful 1-0 victory, favored by an own goal from a Czech player. In the third game, the team lost 2: 3 and thus for the first time after 14 victorious games against Iceland and for the first time a home game in the World Cup qualifiers. The team fell back in the table in third place, but the top spot four days later by a 11-0 draw against the Faroe Islands, in which Hasret Kayikçi scored the last four goals, with simultaneous division of points between Iceland and the Czech Republic to recapture. One week after the team was without a win at the 2018 SheBelieves Cup and came in last, Germany coach Steffi Jones was dismissed.

Horst Hrubesch took over the office of women's federal coach, but his mission was extended after Martina Voss-Tecklenburg, currently coach of Switzerland, agreed that she would leave office after completing the World Cup qualification takes over. Under Hrubesch the remaining four qualifiers were won without conceding, including 2: 0 the return leg in Iceland. They had won against Iceland direct comparison due to the more goals scored and since the Icelandic women could not win the second game against the Czech Republic, Germany was group winner and Iceland also missed the playoff games of the best runners-up for the last European World Cup starting place.

At the World Cup finals, China and Spain as well as South Africa were the opponents of the group stage. With three wins without conceding the round of 16 was achieved. Here Africa champion Nigeria was beaten 3-0. In the quarterfinals after 24 years again a competitive match against Sweden was lost. Although Lina Magull gave the German team the lead in the 16th minute, it only lasted six minutes. Shortly after the half-time break, the Swedes could use a defensive weakness of the German team and achieve the winning goal.

Group B

Round of 16

Quarter-finals

2023 World Cup

Group H

FIFA World Cup record

*Denotes draws including knockout matches decided on penalty kicks.
**Gold background colour indicates that the tournament was won.
***Red border color indicates tournament was held on home soil.

Record by opponent

Goalscorers

Notes

References

 
World Cup
Countries at the FIFA Women's World Cup